Krimchi temples is a complex of seven ancient Hindu temples in the Udhampur District of the Jammu Division in Jammu and Kashmir, India.  It is located on bank of a stream Birunala in village Krimachi, 12 km from Udhampur. This group of temples is locally known as the Pandava Temples.

History 
According to the Archaeological Survey of India  these temples were constructed during 8 to 9 century AD. The temples were constructed in stages. It appears that temples No. 6 and 7 were damaged several centuries ago.

Local belief holds that they go back to the protagonists of the Mahabharata War, or a late Pandava dynasty that ruled in Jammu and Kashmir (speculated by Alexander Cunningham). According to legendary accounts, Raja Kichak was said to be creator of the town Krimchi and the kingdom. It is also said pandavas in exile remained there for a long period. As the temples were built in 8th century, these temple complex reflect the profoundness of Indo-Greek architecture.

Complex 
The complex consists of four large and three small temples. The main temple is 50 feet tall and is dedicated to Hindu deities including Shiva, Ganesha, Vishnu and Parvati. The architecture resembles classical Kashmiri temples of India.

References

External links 

 

8th-century Hindu temples
Hindu temples in Jammu and Kashmir
Archaeological sites in Jammu and Kashmir
Tourist attractions in Udhampur district
Tourist attractions in India